Jim Allen has been writing and photographing for 4x4 magazines including Four Wheeler since the early 1980s, and is the author of eight books on four-wheeling and technical topics. He is credited as a veteran journalist, and a Jeep and four-wheel drive historian.

Media appearances
Jim Allen was consulted prominently in the History Channel's Modern Marvels series, season 10 episode 37: "4x4", (2003), about the history of four-wheel drive vehicles.
He was also consulted both on-screen, and did voice-overs on the PBS-documentary Jeep: Steel Soldier, part of WGTE-TV's "Toledo Stories" series (27 September 2007); and featured as a Jeep historian on the one-hour (44 min runtime) Discovery Times documentary Man and Jeep.

He further appeared in the opening episode of the Discovery Channel's TV-series Shifting Gears with Aaron Kaufman.

Personal background
Jim Allen (1954) has been a soldier, a sailor, an ASE Certified Master Auto Technician, an off-highway driving instructor, and has first-hand experience as a farmer.

Bibliography 
 Classic 4 X 4s, Illustrated Buyer's Guide (November 1, 1997)
 Chevy & GMC Pickup Performance Handbook (Performance Handbook Series; October 1, 2000)
 Jeep (Motorbooks; June 25, 2001)
 Four-Wheeler's Bible (Motorbooks Workshop; December 14, 2002)
 Jeep, Collector's Library ( Motorbooks; December 11, 2004)
 Differentials: identification, restoration & repair with Randy Lyman (Everett, WA: Ring & Pinion Services, 2006)
 Jeep 4x4 Performance Handbook (Motorbooks Workshop; August 15, 2007)
 Four-Wheeler's Bible: 2nd Edition (Motorbooks Workshop; July 19, 2009)
 International Scout Encyclopedia: The Authoritative Guide to IH's Legendary 4x4 with John Glancy (Octane Press, 2016)

See also
 David Doyle - American writer on historic military vehicles, hardware, aircraft and warships
 Steven Zaloga – an American historian, defense consultant, and author on military technology

References

American technology writers